The Class 82 was a type of sub-urban rail electric multiple unit that once operated by Keretapi Tanah Melayu on its KTM Komuter services. Each unit consists of two driving motor cars and a trailer cars. All were retired by 2012 after being replaced by the Class 92.

Design 
The Class 82 was designed with a streamlined sloped head with two high beam lamps concentrated at the center top with two standard headlights at either sides. Route direction is indicated on the front of the train within a confined fluorescent lighted box using a lightly transparent plastic. The Class 82 have two double-leaf pressure plug doors per side each coach. The cab head is designed to be bottom heavy with the bulk of the power transformers and motors located beneath the coach, allowing saloon space to be maximised. The front outer frame is made of heavy carbonized steel which is capable of sustaining high impact. An ARR coupling system is used, which is compatible with all of KTMB's modern rolling stock. Unlike the latter Class 92, the Class 82 like its sister classes are endowed with multi-layered tempered glass that is of a higher degree of impact resistance.

Description 
22 three car sets were built and delivered by Union Carriage & Wagon of South Africa from 1996 to 1997. The Class 82 sets were deployed in stages, with the final set coming into service in December 1998.

The KTM Class 82 three-car formation consists of two motor cabs at either end of the set and a single trailer car in between, the trailer car in between is equipped with a double-arm Z shaped pantograph for  electric pick up. Narrow gangways integrate the three-car sets, allowing full walking from cab to cab. Each car features two double-leaf electric plug doors at either side. Printed route maps are displayed each doors, along with emergency stop levers.

The Class 82 was said to have better energy efficiency when compared to the Class 81. This was due to the GEC Alsthom regenerative braking system being used which gave better acceleration during runs.

Overhauls & Refurbishment 
Over its operational life, the KTM Class 82 has seen its life extended through numerous schemes of overhauling and refurbishment. However, due to closure of Union Carriage & Wagons's international rail business saw an end to any future replacement parts for the Class 82. Tropical weather proved more that than taxing for the Class 82 with the premature failure of many irreplaceable parts. Although, there has been attempts to substitute parts with those of a different make, the economics and technological expertise were not on the side of the Class 82, and the Class 82 soon found itself in the precarious state of having to resort to cannibalize the parts of older sets in order to keep the remaining fleet in operation.

In 2012, an attempt of fresh refurbishments has seen a mixture of traverse and longitudinal seating being introduced with a heavy emphasis on longitudinal seating, in acknowledgement of the classes' main role being in an intra-city commuter. Although, this was a good attempt at making increasing the overall capacity, it failed to addressed a key fundamental problem, the sets were running without replacement parts and off the shelf replacement parts from other makes are incompatible with this class.

2012 also saw the introduction of the special hybrid train service, where diesel locomotives were made to pull these decrepit Class 82 bodies with functional doors, lighting and A/C（short form for air conditioner). Since the power transformers and power pick up systems could not be replaced, the company elected the use of additional diesel generators affixed on hopper wagons to power up the EMU. In effect, it reduced the role of these sets to nothing more than unpowered passenger coaches, but its use still had better convenience than compared to KTMB's traditional unpowered coaches, which typically tend to be those specifically designed for long-distance intercity use, i.e. the doors were narrow and few, with limited standing space while having an open emphasis on comfortable seating. As mentioned the Class 82 is not like that, and was design specifically to meet its role as a sub-urban commuter and gracefully step up to its role as a commuter rail wagon.

Service history 
The Class 82 used to operate in a fixed 3-car formation for its regular service. During the 1995–1999 period it used to operate at peak hours in a 3+3 car formation. But this configuration was soon discontinued.

Briefly from 2010 to 2012, all train sets of this class were used in a hybrid diesel pull configuration in which an unpowered EMU would be towed by a diesel locomotive and while it gets electricity from an attached commercial generator wagon. 
Since the transformers and power pick-ups could not be replaced, the company dubbed this as KTM "Hybrid" trains, serviced at both Batu Caves-Klang and Kajang-Rawang routes.

Despite its young age, the arrival of the KTM Class 92 in 2012 resulted in total retirement of the entire KTM Class 82 fleet, with the many cannibalised for parts, while others are being retired due to accidents and incidents, there are no more working sets available for use, added to complexity of having not able to source any more parts from factory. This marks the end of the entire KTM Class 82's short history.

6 Class 82 sets have been abandoned at Ipoh Rail Yard. The other sets are currently unknown in their location.

Formation 
{| class="wikitable" style="font-size: 90%;"
!rowspan="2"|Set Designation
!colspan="3"|Car Number
!rowspan="2"|Status
|-
!Car 1
!Car 2
!Car 3
|-
|EMU 41
|C8201
|T8201
|C8202
|Retired from Hybrid Service
|-
|EMU 42
|C8203
|T8202
|C8204
|Abandoned at Ipoh
|-
|EMU 43
|C8205
|T8203
|C8206
|Retired from Hybrid Service
|-
|EMU 44
|C8207
|T8204
|C8208
|Abandoned at Ipoh
|-
|EMU 45
|C8209
|T8205
|C8210
|Retired from Hybrid Service
|-
|EMU 46
|C8211
|T8206
|C8212
|Retired from Hybrid Service
|-
|EMU 47
|C8213
|T8207
|C8214
|Retired from Hybrid Service
|-
|EMU 48
|C8215
|T8208
|C8216
|Abandoned at Ipoh
|-
|EMU 49
|C8217
|T8209
|C8218
|Abandoned at Ipoh
|-
|EMU 50
|C8219
|T8210
|C8220
|Abandoned at Ipoh
|-
|EMU 51
|C8221
|T8211
|C8222
|Abandoned at Ipoh
|-
|EMU 52
|C8223
|T8212
|C8224
|Abandoned at Ipoh
|-
|EMU 53
|C8225
|T8213
|C8226
|Abandoned at Ipoh
|-
|EMU 54
|C8227
|T8214
|C8228
|Abandoned at Ipoh
|-
|EMU 55
|C8229
|T8215
|C8230
|Abandoned at Ipoh
|-
|EMU 56
|C8231
|T8216
|C8232
|Retired from Hybrid Service
|-
|EMU 57
|C8233
|T8217
|C8234
|Retired from Hybrid Service
|-
|EMU 58
|C8235
|T8218
|C8236
|Abandoned at Ipoh
|-
|EMU 59
|C8237
|T8219
|C8238
|Retired from Hybrid Service
|-
|EMU 60
|C8239
|T8220
|C8240
|Abandoned at Ipoh
|-
|EMU 61
|C8241
|T8221
|C8242
|Abandoned at Ipoh
|-
|EMU 62
|C8243
|T8222
|C8244
|Abandoned at Ipoh
|}

Gallery

References

KTM Komuter
Multiple units of Malaysia
Train-related introductions in 1997
Train-related introductions in 1999
25 kV AC multiple units